Love Me No More is a 2008 French drama film directed by Jean Becker.

Plot 
Antoine Méliot is a man whose life is full of success. He works in an important enterprise of advertising, he has two beautiful children, a lot of friends, a big quiet house and a loving clever charming woman. One day he suddenly changes his way of life and rejects his wife after being accused of unfaithfulness. In the two following days he will be up to destroy everything of what used to make his happiness. At first he spoils a meeting with a client, he then is rude with his family, insolent and disconnected with his friends and then escapes the region to join his father in Ireland in order to meet someone he hasn't seen for a long time, in order to keep his secret the longest possible.

Cast 
Albert Dupontel - Antoine Méliot
Marie-Josée Croze - Cécile Méliot
Pierre Vaneck - Antoines Vater
Alessandra Martines - Marion
Cristiana Reali - Virginie 
Marie-Christine Adam - Cécile's mother
Mathias Mlekuz - Éric
François Marthouret - Paul
Claire Nebout - Clara
Anne Loiret - Anne-Laure
Guillaume de Tonquédec - Sébastien
Jean Dell - Mortez

Accolades

References

External links 

2008 drama films
2008 films
French drama films
Films based on French novels
Films directed by Jean Becker
StudioCanal films
Films shot in Ireland
Films scored by Alain Goraguer
2000s French films